The Chittenden Senate District was one of 13 Vermont Senate districts included in the redistricting and reapportionment plan developed by the Vermont General Assembly. After the 2022 Census, it was divided into three districts.

The Chittenden District included all of Chittenden County except the town of Colchester (which is in the Grand Isle district).

As of the 2000 census, the state as a whole had a population of 608,827. As there are a total of 30 Senators, there were 20,294 residents per senator.  The Chittenden District had a population of 129,585 in that same census.  The district is apportioned six senators. This equals 21,598 residents per senator, 6.42% above the state average.

District Senators
2005-2006
James C. Condos, Democrat
Edward S. Flanagan, Democrat
James P. Leddy, Democrat
Virginia V. Lyons, Democrat
Hinda Miller, Democrat
Diane B. Snelling, Republican

2007-2008
James C. Condos, Democrat
Edward S. Flanagan, Democrat
Virginia V. Lyons, Democrat
Hinda Miller, Democrat
Douglas A. Racine, Democrat
Diane B. Snelling, Republican

2009-2010
Tim Ashe, Progressive
Edward S. Flanagan, Democrat
Virginia V. Lyons, Democrat
Hinda Miller, Democrat
Douglas A. Racine, Democrat
Diane B. Snelling, Republican

As of 2017
Tim Ashe, Democrat/Progressive
Philip Baruth, Democrat
Debbie Ingram, Democrat
Ginny Lyons, Democrat
Christopher A. Pearson, Progressive/Democrat
Michael Sirotkin, Democrat
As of 2020:

 Kesha Ram, Democrat
 Thomas Chittenden, Democrat
 Christopher Pearson, Progressive
 Michael Sirotkin, Democrat
 Philip Baruth, Democrat
 Virginia V. Lyons, Democrat

Towns and cities in the Chittenden District, 2002–2012 elections

Chittenden County 
Bolton
Buels Gore
Burlington
Charlotte
Essex
Hinesburg
Huntington
Jericho
Milton
Richmond
Shelburne
South Burlington
St. George
Underhill
Westford
Williston
Winooski

See also
Members of the Vermont Senate, 2005-2006 session
Vermont Senate Districts, 2002-2012

External links

 Redistricting information from Vermont Legislature
 2002 and 2012 Redistricting information from Vermont Legislature
 Map of Vermont Senate districts and statistics (PDF) 2002–2012

Chittenden County, Vermont
Vermont Senate districts